MPAO may refer to:

 Polyamine oxidase (propane-1,3-diamine-forming), an enzyme
 N1-acetylpolyamine oxidase, an enzyme 
 Metallocene Polyalphaolefin (mPAO) an advanced synthetic base lubricant oil